Wraxall Manor is a grade II* listed manor house in Wraxall, Dorset, England. The house was built in about 1630, probably for William Lawrence.

References

External links 

Grade II* listed buildings in Dorset
Grade II* listed houses